The North Atlantic Treaty Organization (NATO) is headquartered in a complex in Haren, part of the City of Brussels municipality of Belgium. The staff at the headquarters is composed of national delegations of NATO member states and includes civilian and military liaison offices and officers or diplomatic missions and diplomats of partner countries, as well as the International Staff (IS) and International Military Staff (IMS) filled from serving members of the armed forces of member states. Non-governmental citizens' groups have also grown up in support of NATO, broadly under the banner of the Atlantic Council/Atlantic Treaty Association movement.

Premises

1949-1967: Paris

1967-present: Brussels

Old Brussels headquarters
Problems in the original building stemmed from its hurried construction in 1967, when NATO was forced to move its headquarters from Porte Dauphine in Paris, France following the French withdrawal.

New Brussels headquarters
A new €750 million headquarters building was constructed over the period between 2010 and summer 2016, and was dedicated on 25 May 2017 with a ceremony in the presence of allied Heads of State. Secretary-General Jens Stoltenberg addressed the crowd and President Trump hectored some among the crowd over their failure to live up to the 2% GDP target that was expected of them by their senior partner.

The cost of the new headquarters building escalated to about €1.1 billion or $1.23 billion.

The  complex was designed by an international design consortium led by the US Firm of Skidmore, Owings and Merrill, including Jo Palma. Both Design and Construction were completed under the auspices of the Belgian Ministry of Defense's Project Management Team led by Colonel Christian LaNotte, Belgian Army Engineers. Project Financing and Requirements definition as well as the Design and Construction Phases were overseen for NATO by its HQ Project Office, led by Donald Hutchins (CAPT, US Navy Civil Engineer Corps, Retired) during the design Phase and Brigadier General Anthony Carruth, (British Army Engineer, Retired) during construction.  The New NATO HQ Project is office and home to an international staff of 3800.

See also

 Supreme Headquarters Allied Powers Europe (SHAPE) in Mons, Belgium
 Allied Command Transformation (ACT) in Norfolk, United States

Notes

References

External links

 
Buildings and structures in Brussels